Raymond Arthur Bales (born 6 June 1929 in Norwich, Norfolk, England), known as Billy Bales, was a former international motorcycle speedway rider reached the final of Speedway World Championship in 1955.

Career
Bales started his career with the Yarmouth Bloaters where he  stayed until the start of 1950 when he was called up for National Service. On his return he joined his hometown club, the Norwich Stars and stayed there for thirteen consecutive seasons. The Stars won the National Trophy twice in that time and Bales was selected to ride for England as well as qualifying for the World Final in 1955..

Norwich closed in 1964 so Bales was forced to move on. He was signed by the Sheffield Tigers and remained there until he retired in 1969.

World Final Appearances
 1955 -  London, Wembley Stadium - 11th - 6pts

References

1929 births
Living people
British speedway riders
English motorcycle racers
Norwich Stars riders
Sheffield Tigers riders
Yarmouth Bloaters riders